USS Dolphin (AGSS-555) was a United States Navy diesel-electric deep-diving research and development submarine. She was commissioned in 1968 and decommissioned in 2007. Her 38-year career was the longest in history for a US Navy submarine. She was the Navy's last operational conventionally powered submarine.

Construction and service
Dolphin was designed under project SCB 207. Her keel was laid on 9 November 1962 at the Portsmouth Navy Yard, Kittery, Maine.  She was launched on 8 June 1968, sponsored by Mrs. Maggie Shinobu Inouye, (née Awamura), wife of U.S. Senator Daniel K. Inouye, and commissioned on 17 August 1968 with Lieutenant Commander J.R. McDonnell in command.

Dolphins hull number, "555", is unusual in that it was taken out of sequence. Dolphins hull number was taken from a block of cancelled hull numbers from the World War II-vintage , the last of which was commissioned in 1951. The reason for the selection of "555" as Dolphins hull number is not known.

Despite a recent repair and upgrade, Dolphin was decommissioned on 15 January 2007 and stricken from the Naval Vessel Register on the same date. She is now a museum ship in San Diego Bay under the management of the San Diego Maritime Museum.

Design
The single most significant technical achievement in the development of Dolphin is the pressure hull itself. It is a constant-diameter cylinder, closed at its ends with hemispherical heads, and uses deep frames instead of bulkheads. The entire design of the pressure hull was kept as simple as possible to facilitate its use in structural experiments and trials. Hull openings were minimized for structural strength and minimum hull weight, in addition to eliminating possible sources for flooding casualties. The submarine has no snorkel mast; the main hatch had to be open when the diesel engines were running.

Use
Employed in both civilian and Navy activities, Dolphin was equipped with an extensive instrumentation suite that supported missions such as acoustic deep-water and littoral research, near-bottom and ocean surveys, weapons launches, sensor trials, and engineering evaluations.  Because she was designed as a test platform, Dolphin could be modified both internally and externally to allow installation of up to 12 tons of special research and test equipment. She has internal and external mounting points, multiple electronic hull connectors, and up to 10 equipment racks for project use.

Service record
In August 1969, Dolphin launched a torpedo from the deepest depth that one has ever been fired. Other examples of Dolphins work include:
 first successful submarine-to-aircraft optical communications
 development of a laser imaging system of photographic clarity
 development of an extreme low frequency  antenna for s
 evaluation of various nonacoustic ASW techniques
 evaluation of various low probability of interception active sonars
 first submarine launch of a mobile submarine simulator system
 first successful submarine test of BQS-15 sonar system
 development of highly accurate (10 cm) towed body position monitoring system
 development of a new obstacle-avoidance sonar system
 development of a highly accurate target management system
 evaluation of a possible "fifth force of nature"
 first successful submarine-to-aircraft two-way laser communication
 deepest submarine dive- more than 3,000 ft

Dolphin was overhauled in 1993.  In the late 1990s, Dolphin tested a new sonar system. As a result of Dolphins efforts, this new system will now be retrofitted into the fleet.

Fire and evacuation at sea
Due to high winds and  swells in the ocean, around 75 tons of seawater entered the ship, an amount perilously close to the boat's reserve buoyancy. The flooding shorted electrical panels and started fires.

Chief Machinist's Mate (SS) John D. Wise, Jr., dove into the  water of the flooded pump room. With less than a foot of breathable space in the compartment, he ensured the seawater valves were lined up, allowing pumping out to commence. Once the valves were aligned, he remained in the pump room for more than 90 minutes to keep a submersible pump from becoming clogged. His courageous efforts prevented the loss of the ship and crew. Wise received the Navy and Marine Corps Medal for his efforts.

After 90 minutes, with fire and flooding beyond the ability of the crew to control, Commander Stephen Kelety, Dolphins commanding officer, ordered the crew of 41 and two civilian Navy employees to abandon ship. The Oceanographic Research ship  was operating in the vicinity, and immediately responded to Kelety's call for assistance. They were evacuated by boat to William McGaw after the hatches had been secured. All crewmembers were safely recovered with only a few minor injuries. Two were recovered from the water by United States Coast Guard helicopter during the transfer. William McGaw transported the crew to San Diego.  also came alongside Dolphin and rescued several crewman from the water, but the seas were too rough for full recovery or towing operations.

The quick response of the crew placed the submarine in a stable condition. Submarine Support Vessel  got underway from San Diego early on 22 May to assist in recovery. Dolphin was towed back to San Diego the following day.

Retirement

Dolphin underwent three and a half years of repairs and upgrades at a cost of $50 million, then completed sea trials during the summer of 2005, and returned to her duties for one year.

In mid-2006, the Navy decided to retire Dolphin, citing the $18 million her operations cost annually. She was deactivated on 22 September 2006, and decommissioned and struck from the Naval Vessel Register on 15 January 2007.  Her 38-year career was the longest in history for a US Navy submarine.

Dolphin was officially transferred to the San Diego Maritime Museum in September 2008, to become the eighth vessel in their floating collection. She was opened to the public for the first time on 4 July 2009.

Awards
National Defense Service Medal with two stars
Global War on Terrorism Service Medal

See also
 Major submarine incidents since 2000
 NR-1

References

External links

 Navy press release about the flooding incident and medal award
 San Diego Union-Tribune article about decommissioning

 

Maritime Museum of San Diego
Submarines of the United States Navy
Cold War submarines of the United States
United States submarine accidents
Maritime incidents in 2002
Ships built in Kittery, Maine
1968 ships
Museum ships in California
Museum ships in San Diego